Prostalomus parcepunctatus is a species of beetle in the family Carabidae, the only species in the genus Prostalomus.

References

Pterostichinae